Melvin Harrison Turpin (December 28, 1960 – July 8, 2010) was an American professional basketball player. He played five seasons in the National Basketball Association (NBA). He was an All-American college player at the University of Kentucky, where as a senior he led the Wildcats to the 1984 Final Four.

Basketball career
A 6'11" center, Turpin was born in Lexington, Kentucky and attended Fork Union Military Academy in Fork Union, Virginia from 1979–80. He was FUMA's most valuable player for the postgraduate squad under coach Fletcher Arritt, also being voted the number one player in the state for varsity basketball; he averaged 19 points, 12 rebounds and six blocked shots, being inducted into the Fork Union Military Academy Hall of Fame in 2000.

At the University of Kentucky, Turpin made the 1st Team All-SEC for 1982 and 1983 and was a starter for the NCAA Final Four Kentucky Wildcats team in 1983–84. In 1984, he was the Southeastern Conference scoring leader, holding the record for the most field goals made in SEC tournament play in addition to co-holding the honor of the most points scored in a single tournament game. Turpin scored 42 points in a game against University of Tennessee as a junior, making 18 of 22 shots from the field; he similarly dominated Louisiana State University as a senior, shooting 15 of 17 from the floor and five of six from the free throw line.

In 1984, Turpin was chosen as the sixth overall pick in the first round by the Washington Bullets in the NBA draft, being immediately traded to the Cleveland Cavaliers. As a professional, however, he struggled with his weight, and after six seasons with the Cavaliers, the Utah Jazz, CAI Zaragoza and the Bullets, he retired. Earning the derisive nicknames "Dinner Bell Mel" and "The Mealman", Turpin was considered one of the biggest busts in a draft class that included future greats such as Hakeem Olajuwon, Michael Jordan, Charles Barkley and John Stockton. In a 2004 Sports Illustrated article, Turpin quipped, "In my day, they thought the big man was supposed to be thin. They didn't know too much. It was medieval".

During his National Basketball Association spell, 361 regular season games brought him averages of 8 points and nearly 5 rebounds. In 1988–89, before his last season altogether, he played in Spain with CAI Zaragoza, later being exchanged to the Jazz for José Ortiz.

Death
During the 2000s, Turpin worked as a security guard. On July 8, 2010, he committed suicide in his Lexington home from an apparent self-inflicted gunshot wound. The reason for his suicide was never determined, and it was never made public if he left a suicide note. He was 49 years old at the time of his death.

References

External links
Stats at BasketballReference
Stats at Basketball-Reference

1960 births
2010 suicides
20th-century African-American sportspeople
21st-century African-American people
African-American basketball players
All-American college men's basketball players
American expatriate basketball people in Spain
American men's basketball players
Basketball players from Lexington, Kentucky
Bryan Station High School alumni
CB Zaragoza players
Centers (basketball)
Cleveland Cavaliers players
Kentucky Wildcats men's basketball players
Suicides by firearm in Kentucky
Utah Jazz players
Washington Bullets draft picks
Washington Bullets players